Daniela Viorica Silivaș-Harper (born 9 May 1972), is a Romanian former artistic gymnast best known for medaling in every single event at one Olympics, winning six medals (three gold, two silver, and one bronze) at the 1988 Summer Games in Seoul. In doing so, she was the fourth female gymnast to achieve this, after Maria Gorokhovskaya (1952), Larisa Latynina (1960, 1964) and Věra Čáslavská (1968). As of 2023, Silivaș is the only one athlete, male or female, having accomplished this feat, in the Modern Era of Artistic Gymnastics, in a non-boycotted Olympics.

Also, Silivaș is the first gymnast in history to win 3 Olympic and World individual titles on three (from four) apparatus: uneven bars and floor (1988 OG, 1987 and 1989 WC) and beam (1988 OG, 1985 and 1989 WC), an achievement equalized only by Simone Biles, 20 years later. She won 16 Olympic and World medals, from which 10 were golds. In 1987, she dominated the European Championships held in Moscow, being medalled on every single event: 4 gold (individual AA, bars, beam and floor) and silver on vault. In her career, she earned 24 perfect 10 scores, from which 7 were earned in Seoul, equalizing 1976 Nadia Comăneci's record.

Silivaș was chosen as one of the "Top Ten All-Around Gymnasts of All Time", in a poll in Inside Gymnastics magazine. She was known for her technical excellence, difficult routines, charming performances, and artistic flair.

In 1989, Silivaș's training was hampered by a knee injury and by the closure of the Deva National Training Center during the Romanian Revolution. She retired in 1991 and moved to the United States, where she is now a gymnastics coach. In 2002, she was inducted into the International Gymnastics Hall of Fame.

Early life and career
Silivaș was born in Deva, Romania, on 9 May 1972. She began gymnastics at age 6 and was coached by Béla Károlyi for six months before his defection in 1981. Silivaș won her school's championships in 1980, and was the Romanian junior national champion in 1981 and 1982. She continued to compete in various junior meets through 1984, with a particularly strong showing at the 1984 Junior European Championships, where she won the balance beam title, earned silver medals on the uneven bars and floor exercise, and placed fourth in the all-around. At the 1984 Junior Friendship Tournament (Druzhba), she won gold medals in the all-around and uneven bars over a strong field that included future Olympic and World medalists Svetlana Boguinskaya, Aurelia Dobre, and Dagmar Kersten.

Senior career

Age falsification
In 1985, the Romanian Gymnastics Federation changed Silivaș's birth year from 1972 to 1970 to make her age eligible for the World Championships in Montreal. The falsification was suspected by some, but was never proven until Silivaș herself revealed it in 2002. She stated that she was never consulted about the matter: officials simply gave her a new passport, called her attention to the birth date, and informed her that she was now 15.

1985–1987
Although she was only 13 at the 1985 Worlds, Silivaș scored a perfect 10 en route to capturing the balance beam title, defeating the reigning Olympic champion, her teammate Ecaterina Szabo, in the process. She finished behind reigning co-world champion Yelena Shushunova in the individual all-around at the 1986 World Cup and quickly established herself as the leader of the Romanian gymnastics team.

Silivaș's greatest triumph took place at the 1987 European Gymnastics Championships in Moscow, where she won the individual all-around, uneven bars, balance beam and floor exercise titles in addition to taking a silver medal on the vault. At the time, every dominant nation in women's gymnastics was located in Europe, and winning the European title over a deep field of Soviet, East German, and Bulgarian gymnasts was a major victory.

At the 1987 World Championships in Rotterdam, Silivaș helped the Romanian squad win the team title, defeating the Soviet team for the first time since 1979. She was a favorite for the all-around title, but—hampered by low scores carried over from the team optionals, where she had fallen on the balance beam on a split leap, as well as a shaky uneven bars routine in the all-around—she still managed to win the bronze medal behind teammate Aurelia Dobre and Shushunova, especially due to her strong scores, including two perfect 10.00s, during the team compulsory round. In the event finals, she won gold medals on the uneven bars and floor exercise.

1988 Olympics 
At the 1988 Olympics in Seoul, the Romanian team finished second to the Soviets. Individually, Silivaș was one of the favorites, along with Dobre and Shushunova, for the all-around title.

The all-around was a hotly anticipated battle between Silivaș, the technician and dancer, and Shushunova, the powerhouse and tumbler. Both received scores of 10.0 on floor. Shushunova received her second 10.0 on vault; Silivaș received hers on the uneven bars. Silivaș was in the lead entering the final rotation, but a score of 9.950 on the vault dropped her to second place, 0.025 behind Shushunova.

Silivaș's score on vault came under particular scrutiny. Of the six judges on the panel, three gave her first vault a 10.0; two others gave her 9.9s. However, the Soviet judge on the panel, Nellie Kim, gave her a 9.8. On her second vault, Silivaș took a hop on her landing; all six judges gave her 9.9s. Silivaș was visibly upset after Shushunova's scores were posted and at the medal ceremony; according to a report in International Gymnast, she said, "After my last vault, I thought maybe I should be the champion." However, she did not argue the results publicly. Her former coach, Bela Károlyi, noted, "This kid had the honesty and decency to shut up. She didn’t want to say 'I’m better' because she knows Shushunova is the Olympic champion, but she couldn’t praise a rival. So she just didn’t say a word. These kids have more decency than all the judges and coaches in the world."

In spite of the controversy, no score protests were ever filed by Silivaș, her coaches, or her federation, and no disciplinary measures were taken against any of the judges. In addition, even though Kim's first mark was considered questionable by many fans, it did not figure into Silivaș's final score: in 1988, the highest and lowest marks of the panel were dropped, and the final score was the average of the remaining four marks. Also, in spite of her vault score, Silivaș's all-around total was higher than that of Shushunova: if the competition had been held under the New Life rule, she would have won. In the third rotation, Shushunova was awarded 10s for her floor exercise by every judge except the Romanian judge, who gave her a 9.9, which did not count towards her final score.

Silivaș returned in the event finals to win gold medals on the uneven bars, floor, and beam, as well as bronze on vault behind Soviet Svetlana Boguinskaya (gold) and teammate Gabriela Potorac (silver). In doing this, she became the only gymnast in Seoul to win medals in every event (team, all-around, and the four apparatus finals). She also equaled Nadia Comăneci's record of seven perfect 10 scores in a single Olympic Games.

Post-Olympics
Despite a serious knee injury in 1989, Silivaș successfully defended her floor exercise title at the European Championships and won three additional medals. In the all-around, she placed second to Svetlana Boguinskaya. Still injured, she went to the 1989 World Championships, where she placed 12th in the all-around after falling from the balance beam. In event finals, however, she captured three more gold medals on the bars, beam, and floor.

After several more competitions in 1989, Silivaș underwent surgery on her knee. She intended to start training again afterwards, but the National Training Center at Deva was closed during the Romanian Revolution of 1989, putting an early end to her career.

Life after gymnastics
Silivaș retired from gymnastics in 1991 and moved to the United States, settling in Atlanta. In 2002, she was inducted into the International Gymnastics Hall of Fame; she still holds the record as the youngest gymnast to receive this honor.

Silivaș works full-time as a gymnastics coach at Jump start Gymnastics in Sandy Springs, Georgia. In May 2003, she married Scott Harper, a sports management graduate living in the Atlanta area. The couple have three children: two sons, Jadan Scott (born 8 April 2004) and Rylan Bryce Harper (born October 2009), and a daughter, Ava Luciana (born 8 November 2005). They live in Marietta, Georgia.

Skills
The hallmarks of Silivaș's gymnastics were her impeccable form and execution, difficulty, and expressive dance. Many of the skills she performed in the 1988 Olympics still carry high difficulty ratings in the Code of Points today including the "Silivas" on floor, which is a double-twisting double back tucked somersault and has the third highest difficulty assignment of "H" in women's gymnastics. Between 1985 and 1988, the highlights of Silivaș's routines included:

Vault

 Tucked Yurchenko full
 Layout Yurchenko full

Uneven bars

 Stalder 1/2 pirouette directly into Endo 1/2 pirouette
 Straddled Deltchev
 Straddled Tkatchev
 Shaposhnikova transition
 Free hip frontaway to front 1/2 dismount

Balance beam

 The "Silivaș" mount: shoulder stand–pirouette to chest stand
 Back handspring, two layout step-outs
 Back handspring, layout on two feet
 Aerial front walkover
 Double back tuck dismount

Floor exercise

 "Back to back" tumbling: Round-off, back handspring, double twist, punch front, round-off, back handspring, double twist, punch front.
 Triple twist
 Double twisting double back tuck ("Silivaș")
 Tucked full-in
 Piked full-in
 Double back tuck
 Double tour–double pirouette
 The "Silivaș" skill, which involved spinning on the ankles

Eponymous skills
Silivaș has two eponymous skills listed in the Code of Points.

Competitive history

See also
List of multiple Olympic medalists at a single Games
List of Olympic female gymnasts for Romania
List of top Olympic gymnastics medalists
List of top medalists at the World Artistic Gymnastics Championships

References

External links

 
 
 
 
 Daniela Silivas at Gymn Forum
 Silivaș(Floor Exercise skills)
 Ultima mare reprezentaţie a Danielei Silivaş, 3 noiembrie 2009, Marius Mihalcea, Jurnalul Național

1972 births
Living people
Romanian female artistic gymnasts
Sportspeople from Fulton County, Georgia
People from Deva, Romania
Olympic gymnasts of Romania
Olympic gold medalists for Romania
Olympic silver medalists for Romania
Olympic bronze medalists for Romania
Olympic medalists in gymnastics
Gymnasts at the 1988 Summer Olympics
World champion gymnasts
Medalists at the World Artistic Gymnastics Championships
European champions in gymnastics
Originators of elements in artistic gymnastics
People from Sandy Springs, Georgia
Medalists at the 1988 Summer Olympics
20th-century Romanian women